John McShane may refer to:
John A. McShane (1850–1923), United States Representative from Nebraska
John James McShane (1882–1972), British Member of Parliament
Jon McShane (born 1991), Scottish footballer